The 2008 West Coast Conference Baseball Championship Series was held on May 24, 2008 at San Diego's home stadium, John Cunningham Stadium in San Diego, California, and pitted the top two finishers from the WCC regular season.

Seeding

Results
Game One

Game Two

References

West Coast Conference Baseball Championship
Tournament
Baseball competitions in San Diego
West Coast Conference Baseball Championship Series
West Coast Conference Baseball Championship Series
College sports tournaments in California